The open J/80 competition at the 2014 Asian Games in Incheon was held from 27 September to 1 October 2014. The competition was match race format. It consisted of a round-robin a semi-finals and final series. The top four crews from the round-robin were seeded into the semifinal.

Schedule
All times are China Standard Time (UTC+08:00)

Squads

Results

Round robin

Knockout round

References

External links
Official website

Open match racing